This is a List of Theta Phi Alpha chapters including both active and inactive chapters.

Collegiate chapters
Following are Theta Phi Alpha's collegiate chapters, with active chapters indicated in bold and inactive chapters in italics.

Notes

Alumnae chapters
The Alumnae Chapters of Theta Phi Alpha are listed below.

References

Lists of chapters of United States student societies by society
chapters